Andrés Alejandro Palomeque González (July 1, 1971 – March 22, 2009) was a Mexican luchador (Spanish for "masked professional wrestler"). He is best known for appearing under the stage name Abismo Negro, which is Spanish for "Black Abyss", in the Asistencia Asesoría y Administración (AAA) promotion. Before appearing under the ring name Abismo Negro, Palomeque worked for five years under the alias "[the] Winners" and before that also wrestled as the characters "Alex Dinamo", "Pequeño Samurai", and "Furor" for short periods. Palomeque owned and operated the Gimnasio Abismo Negro, a wrestling school where individuals were trained to become professional wrestlers.

In his professional wrestling career, Palomeque worked for the two most prominent professional wrestling promotions in Mexico: Consejo Mundial de Lucha Libre (CMLL) and AAA. He also worked for the North American–based promotions the World Wrestling Federation (WWF) and Total Nonstop Action Wrestling (TNA) due to talent exchange programs between AAA and WWF in 1997 and TNA in 2004, as well as making appearances for the Michinoku Pro and Pro Wrestling Noah promotions in Japan.

On March 22, 2009, Palomeque was found dead in a river near El Rosario, Sinaloa; the official cause of death was listed as drowning. On the night before, a wrestler using the Abismo Negro outfit worked an AAA show pretending to be Palomeque; this incident caused the promoter to be barred from promoting shows for two years. Palomeque was inducted into the AAA Hall of Fame in June 2013.

Early life
Andrés Alejandro Palomeque González was born July 1, 1971, in Villahermosa, Tabasco, Mexico. Palomeque started to get interested in professional wrestling at the age of nine when his father, Juan Francisco Palomeque Torres, took him to his first wrestling event. Later the Palomeque Family moved to Poza Rica where a young Palomeque took up Pentathlon (long jump, high jump, 110 metres hurdles run, shot put, 1500 metres run) in school. He and his brother, César Palomeque, had an interest in Martial Arts and trained together for years. When Palomeque was thirteen years old he began working in a gymnasium where professional wrestlers were trained, initially he paid for the use of the gymnasium by cleaning it after hours. When the family moved back to the Tabasco region he began training under Don Nerio Soto, who worked under the ring name El Noruego (the Norwegian), and his brother Delio Soto to become a luchador, or professional wrestler. Professional wrestlers perform in a non-competitive sport based on simulated fighting with storylines written by creative teams and matches with predetermined results. Don Soto later recollects how he and his family took the young man in and made him part of their family, practically adopting him while he was enrolled in Soto's wrestling school and later as he worked on the local wrestling circuit. Palomeque made his professional wrestling debut in 1987, at the age of 16, under the ring name "Alex Dinamo".

Professional wrestling career
Palomeque received further training from famous Mexican wrestling coaches Diablo Velasco and Ray Mendoza before changing his character and ring name to "Pequeño Samurai"—a masked persona patterned after the Japanese Samurai tradition. In 1991, Palomeque began working for Consejo Mundial de Lucha Libre (CMLL; Spanish for "World Wrestling Council"), the biggest wrestling promotion in Mexico at that time. In CMLL, he worked as Furor, another masked ring persona. While working as Furor, Palomeque won his first Luchas de apuestas, or "bet match" when he defeated his mentor El Noruego in a match where Noruego's hair and Palomeque's mask was at stake.

Winners
In 1992 CMLL head writer Antonio Peña left the company to create his own wrestling promotion Asistencia Asesoría y Administración (AAA; Spanish for "Assistance, Consulting and Administration") promotion; Palomeque was one of the many young wrestlers who left CMLL to work for the newly formed AAA. In AAA, his ring personal was changed and he became "Winners" (sometimes written Winner's), a fan favorite character (known as a Técnico in Lucha Libre) who wore a silver bodysuit and mask. Palomeques work as "Winners" earned him a match on the very first Triplemanía where he teamed with Super Caló and El Salsero to defeat the team of May Flowers, Rudy Reyna, and Baby Sharon in a Six Man Tag Team match. The following year at Triplemanía II-A he teamed up with Rey Misterio and Rey Misterio Jr. to defeat the team known as Los Destructores (Tony Arce, Vulcano, and Rocco Valente). In 1995, Winners participated in a Relevos Suicidas Tag Team match, in which the losing team members have a match of their own, with the loser of that encounter being forced to unmask. Winners team won the match, keeping him from having to defend his mask in a match. Eight days later at Triplemanía III-B, Winners' mask was on the line in a match against Marabunta; Winners defeated Marabunta in a Luchas de Apuestas, Mask vs. Mask match. On June 30, 1995, at Triplemanía III-C, Winners participated in another "mask vs. mask" match, his third in three weeks. This time, Winners was not successful, as he lost to Super Caló and was forced to unmask. The loss of the mask did not hurt Winners' popularity, on the contrary it intensified as the hansome Palomeque became even more popular with the female fans. Despite losing his mask to Super Caló the two continued to work together as a team. On June 15, 1996, Winners and Caló teamed up with Rey Misterio Jr. and Oro Jr. to defeat the team of Perro Silva, Halloween, Kraken, and Mosco de la Merced at Triplemanía IV-B. A month later, Winners, Caló, La Parka and El Mexicano defeated Jerry Estrada, Fishman, Villano IV, and May Flowers in one of the featured matches of Triplemanía IV-C.

Abismo Negro
In January 1997, Palomeque's character was changed from that of the quintessential heroic ladies' man known as "Winners", to that of a cheating villain (referred to as a Rudo) known as "Abismo Negro". Part of his new routine as Abismo Negro was a flamethrower display, created by using a lighter and an Aerosol spray can. Palomeque would regularly use this during his entrance and on occasion during a match as when he worked as "Abismo Negro" character. As part of his Rudo act Palomeque began using the Marinete — a wrestling move known as a Piledriver where he simulates driving the top of his opponents' head into the mat — the Marinete is "banned" Mexican wrestling, which means that it can lead to a disqualification if used during the match. The Marinete became such a signature move for the Abismo Negro character that he earned the nickname El Rey del Martinete (The King of the Piledriver). He made his debut as Abismo Negro on January 10, 1997, in an Eight Man Tag Team match. Shortly after his debut as Abismo Negro, he made his World Wrestling Federation (WWF) debut on the January 19, 1997, episode of the WWF Free For All pay-per-view event pre–show before the 1997 Royal Rumble. On the telecast, Negro teamed with Heavy Metal and Histeria in a losing effort against the team of Octagón, Blue Demon Jr., and Tinieblas Jr. in a six-man tag team match. This match was one of the early results of a working relationship between the WWF and AAA that had been created in late 1996. The relationship saw Negro make an appearance in January against Perro Aguayo Jr. and two appearances on the WWF's primary television program Monday Night Raw in March 1997. During his appearances in March, Negro was announced as being part of Los Vipers, a recently created alliance of wrestlers. After March, Negro did not make any more appearances for the WWF.

In AAA, Cibernético formed Los Vipers with Negro along with Psicosis (II), Mosco De La Merced, Maniaco and Histeria. Histeria was replaced a few weeks later by Histeria II. In 1998, Negro acquired a "mascot": a midget wrestler called Mini Abismo Negro. Abismo, Mini Abismo, and new Vipers member Electroshock were defeated by Octagón, his mascot Octagóncito, and Pentagón in a six-man tag team match at Triplemanía. Los Vipers engaged in several scripted rivalries with other AAA groups, such as the group of masked wrestlers dressed as clowns known as Los Payasos. They also had a long-running rivalry with Los Vatos Locos—consisting of Espiritu, Picudo, Nygma, May Flowers, and Silver Cat during the rivalry—over the Mexican National Atómicos Championship. Los Vipers won the Atómicos titles from Los Vatos on several occasions, but Negro was not part of the teams that won. Palomeque wrestling as Abismo Negro did capture a title of his own when he defeated Pentagón on May 19, 1998, to win the Mexican National Middleweight Championship, a title he held until January 1999.

In 1999, Los Vipers split into two factions, with Abismo Negro leading a splinter group called Los Vipers Extreme consisting of Electroshock, Pentagón, Shiima, El Cuervo and Mini Abismo Negro while Cibernético created a group called Los Vipers Primera Clase (First Class Vipers). After less than two months, the angle was dropped and Los Vipers reunited. Not long after Los Vipers reunited, Cibernético formed a group called Lucha Libre Latina (LLL), a group intent on taking over AAA that was inspired by World Championship Wrestling's New World Order. Los Vipers became a subgroup within LLL, and Negro assumed leadership of Los Vipers. On May 2, 1999, Negro and Electroshock teamed up to defeat Perro Aguayo and Perro Aguayo Jr. to win the Mexican National Tag Team Championship. Los Vipers held the tag team title for four months before losing it to the team of Haytor and the Panther.

In 2000, Palomeque participated in a AAA tour of Japan and competed at Triplemanía VIII, where he was on the losing side of an eight-man tag team match main event; Negro teamed with Cibernetico, Shiima Nobunaga and Electro Shock against Octagón, Jushin Thunder Liger, Latin Lover and Cuije. While touring with AAA, Palomeuqe also made an appearance at Michinoku Pro's April 9 Sumo Hall card, where he defeated Oriental. On May 7, Abismo Negro and Electroshock regained the Mexican National Tag Team title by defeating Haytor and the Panther but only held on to the title for two months before losing it to Héctor Garza and Perro Aguayo Jr.

Negro became one of the driving forces in LLL's feud with AAA owner Antonio Peña and his AAA loyalists. Over the years, Negro feuded with the top técnicos of AAA such as La Parka Jr., Octagón and Latin Lover. Negro's position as one of AAA's top workers was cemented on March 5, 2000, when he competed in AAA's annual Rey de Reyes tournament. In the opening round, he defeated Dos Caras, Killer and Psicosis II and in the finals, he defeated El Alebrije, Charly Manson and Cibernético to win the 2000 Rey de Reyes tournament. Negro's status as a main eventer caused storyline problems between LLL's leader Cibernético and Abismo Negro, leading to a series of matches between the two to see who should lead Los Vipers. On September 29, 2000, Negro defeated Cibernético in a one on one match at Verano de Escandalo (2000). When the two faced off in a steel cage match at Guerra de Titanes (2000), the match ended without a winner, after which the rivalry between the leader and the deputy leader was put on the back burner. In 2001, Negro almost won Rey de Reyes again, but La Parka Jr. defeated him in the finals. His string of losses continued at Triplemanía IX, where the LLL team of Abismo Negro, Cibernético, Electroshock and Mascara Maligna lost to Mascara Sagrada, El Alebrije, Octagón and La Parka Jr. when Negro was forced to submit.

In 2000 Abismo Negro won the hair of the Panther in Lucha del reves match, a contest where two masked wrestlers put their hair on the line instead of their mask. On September 7, 2001 Abismo Negro won another Lucha del reves match, defeating El Alebrije. In December 2002, Negro and Mini Abismo Negro made it to the finals of a tournament to crown the first ever AAA Mascot Tag Team Champions but lost to Mascara Sagrada and Mascarita Sagrada. Negro qualified for the Rey de Reyes (2003) final, but La Parka Jr. once again defeated him. In 2004, LLL was phased out in favor of a new super group known as La Legión Extranjera or the Foreign Legion in English, which meant that Los Vipers now regularly teamed with foreign wrestlers, especially NWA-TNA performers such as Abyss.

Total Nonstop Action Wrestling
In 2004, TNA and AAA began a working relationship that saw TNA wrestlers work in Mexico and AAA wrestlers make several appearances on TNA's weekly pay-per-views. Managed by AAA owner Antonio Peña, Palomeque, working as Abismo Negro, along with Héctor Garza, Juventud Guerrera, Mr. Águila, and later Heavy Metal, worked for TNA as Team AAA in the TNA 2004 America's X Cup Tournament. The team made their debut on January 28, 2004, at TNA Weekly pay-per-view event #78, defeating the team of Eric Young, Shark Boy, Matt Stryker and Chad Collyer. In the following weeks, Negro and Team AAA won against Elix Skipper, the team of Jerry Lynn and Sonjay Dutt and finally all of Team USA in a 4 on 4 match to claim the Americas X Cup. Four weeks later Team AAA successfully defended the X Cup against Team Canada, as Abismo Negro and Juventud Guerrera defeated the team of Teddy Hart and Jack Evans to tie the score between the two teams, allowing for a final four-on-four elimination match that Team AAA won.

Abismo Negro and the rest of Team AAA returned for the 2004 World X Cup Tournament where they now competed as "Team Mexico". Abismo Negro remained undefeated until April 7, 2004, when his team lost to James Mason and Jason Allgood in one of the first matches of the World X Cup Tournament. Later in the night, Team Mexico defeated Team UK to even the score. The World Cup saw Team Mexico lose to Team USA, Team Canada (Eric Young and Bobby Roode), and Team Japan (Ryuji Hijikata and Mitsu Hirai Jr.). Team Mexico tied in points with Team USA and Team Canada, which meant that a representative of each team met in an Ultimate X match to determine the winner of the tournament. Héctor Garza represented Mexico, but in the end Team USA's Chris Sabin won the match and the tournament.

Return to AAA
After the World X Cup tournament ended, Negro returned to AAA full-time taking full charge of Los Vipers. In early 2005, he was once again involved in the final match of that year's Rey de Reyes, but La Parka Jr. defeated him for the third time. AAA hinted at a possible técnico turn when Negro, along with Psicosis and Mini Psicosis, attacked Cibernético. The two faced off in a cage match, won by Cibernético, but they eventually reconciled their differences once more. At some point after 2005, Abismo Negro won the hair of Stuka Jr. in a Lucha del reves match. Despite rumors that he was jumping to Consejo Mundial de Lucha Libre, Negro remained in AAA and was sent on a tour with Pro Wrestling Noah in the spring of 2006. Later in the year, he finally turned técnico and began a sustained storyline with Cibernético and his group La Secta Cibernetica. The on again, off again storyline with Cibernético was put on hold when Cibernético suffered a severe knee injury in late 2006. At some point during 2006, Los Vipers left La Legión due to their "Anti-Mexican" philosophy and began fighting La Legión and La Legión's imported wrestlers. At Verano de Escandalo (2006), Negro, Charly Manson, Electroshock and Histeria lost to Team TNA (Homicide, Low Ki, Samoa Joe and A.J. Styles).

Black Abyss
In late 2007, AAA created a ring persona for a new wrestler called Black Abyss; the gimmick featured the same mask and attire as Negro and used a similar wrestling style to Negro as well. Initially, it was believed that this was done because there were rumors of him jumping to CMLL or to cover several no-shows. In 2008, Negro's "almost winning" streak at Rey de Reyes continued as he lost in the final to El Zorro. Black Abyss made sure Negro did not win but interfering on Zorro's behalf during the match, furthering the storyline between the two. During the fall of 2008, AAA pushed the storyline further by having Black Abyss "injure" Negro with his own trademark move the "Martinete". Abismo Negro was scheduled to take part in Triplemanía XVI in a match where he would face Los Vipers (Psicosis, Histeria, Black Abyss and Mr. Niebla) in a cage match, but in the weeks leading up to the show Abismo Negro suffered an injury and the match had to be cancelled, AAA used the attack at Rey de Reyes as a storyline explanation of why the match did not take place. At the 2008 Guerra de Titanes, Negro returned to challenge Los Vipers' Revolution and specifically Black Abyss. Subsequently, the storyline between Negro and Black Abyss seemed to be building to a Luchas de Apuestas fight between the two, with their masks on the line. Both Abismo and Black Abyss were booked in the same four-way elimination match qualifier at the Rey de Reyes (2009) event. Negro was able to eliminate Black Abyss from the match but was in turn eliminated by Latin Lover. Black Abyss still competed under the Black Abyss name, still as a rudo, but seemingly only a couple times on TV since then. Black Abyss has stated his wishes to continue with the character to honor the memory of Abismo Negro, but AAA didn't shown a lot of interest in using it on TV. In October 2010 it was reported that Black Abyss had left AAA.

Abismo Negro II
On September 27, 2011, AAA announced the start of a competition to find a new Abismo Negro. In the end no one was chosen to take over the Abismo Negro character.

Personal life
Palomeque was married to a woman named Martha for 15 years and the couple had four children, two girls and two boys. Palomeque's wife has been suffering from breast cancer for a number of years.

He often appeared on the morning television program Vida TV, in full wrestling gear and persona, billed as Abismo Negro. He usually appeared as a kind of judge for talent contests on the show earning him the nickname Fiscal De Hierro de la Televisión (the Iron Judge of Television). Palomeque owned and operated "Gimnasio Abismo Negro" where he taught both professional wrestling and physical fitness. Graduates of Abismo Negro's wrestling school include Independent wrestling workers El Intocable, Extassis and Mini Cibernético as well as AAA workers Sexy Star and Aero Star. Abismo Negro is a playable character in AAA's first ever video game, AAA El Videojuego. The Abismo Negro character was one of the first characters used to promote the game and show the quality of the graphic rendering.

Death
Palomeque was found dead on March 22, 2009. His body was found in a river near the town of El Rosario, Sinaloa. According to a bus driver who was transporting Palomeque and other passengers to Mexico City on Friday night March 20, Palomeque became agitated, panicked and demanded to be let off the bus despite it being 1:30 in the morning. A text message he sent to his wife after leaving the bus confirms that Palomeque found himself lost on the dark hillside. After receiving the text message, his wife contacted local wrestling promoter Vicente Martinez, who organized a search party. On the morning of March 22, Palomeque was found floating face down in the river. Afterwards, medical expert Jesús Enrique Castro López stated that such an anxiety attack could be steroid related, but Palomeque's alleged steroid abuse has not been confirmed. An autopsy was carried out on March 23, which determined that the cause of death was drowning, and no further investigation into the death is planned. A memorial was held in Mexico City on March 24 for friends and family of Palomeque, many of whom showed up without their masks on, to keep the focus of the event on Palomeque. His body was subsequently cremated, with the ashes taken to Villahermosa to be buried.

On Saturday March 21, while Palomeque was either lost in the hills or already dead, someone worked as Abismo Negro on an AAA show in Cancun. In the past, the wrestler known as Black Abyss had worked as Abismo Negro when Palomeque failed to show, but this time Black Abyss was not the man behind the mask, as he was on the opposing team that night. Following the discovery of Palomeque's body, the deception in Cancun received national coverage in Mexico and the local promoter responsible for the show, Renán Martínez, was suspended for two years by the Benito Júarez Boxing and Wrestling commission.

On October 26, 2009 AAA held the Torneo Abismo Negro in honor of Palomeque, the tournament was a 7-man gauntlet-style match and included a mix of five AAA veterans and two Abismo Negro students. The participants were Cuervo, Black Abyss, Gato Eveready, Kempo Dragon, Joe Líder, Extreme Tiger and Relámpago. Relámpago, Abismo Negro's last student to turn professional, won the match after 48 minutes. The event was not televised and did not become an annual event. During Triplemania XVII there was a moment of silence in memory of Abismo Negro, Antonio Peña and Mitsuharu Misawa (Misawa had died the night before).

Championships and accomplishments
Asistencia Asesoría y Administración
AAA Mascot Tag Team Championship (1 time) – with Mini Abismo Negro
Mexican National Middleweight Championship (1 time)
Mexican National Tag Team Championship (2 time) – with Electroshock (2)
AAA Rey de Reyes (2000)
AAA Hall of Fame (Class of 2013)
Pro Wrestling Illustrated
PWI ranked him #91 of the 500 best singles wrestlers of the PWI 500 in 2004
Total Nonstop Action Wrestling
America's X Cup (2004) – with Mr. Águila, Juventud Guerrera, Héctor Garza and Heavy Metal

Luchas de Apuestas record

See also
 List of premature professional wrestling deaths

Footnotes

References

Further reading

1971 births
2009 deaths
20th-century professional wrestlers
21st-century professional wrestlers
Accidental deaths in Mexico
Deaths by drowning
Masked wrestlers
Mexican male professional wrestlers
Professional wrestlers from Tabasco
People from Villahermosa
Professional wrestling trainers
Mexican National Tag Team Champions